Mateusz Cetnarski (born 6 July 1988) is a Polish former professional footballer who played as a midfielder.

Career

Club
In June 2011, he joined Śląsk Wrocław on a three-year contract. On 3 July 2017 he was loaned from Cracovia to Sandecja Nowy Sącz. On 11 August 2020 he signed with Korona Kielce. On 21 February 2021 he signed with the Zanzibari second-tier club Pili Pili DB Jambiani (as a player-coach).

He retired from football in 2021.

National team
He made his national debut on 2 June 2010 against Serbia.

References

External links
 
  
 

1988 births
People from Kolbuszowa
Sportspeople from Podkarpackie Voivodeship
Living people
Polish footballers
Player-coaches
Poland under-21 international footballers
Poland international footballers
Association football midfielders
GKS Bełchatów players
Śląsk Wrocław players
Widzew Łódź players
MKS Cracovia (football) players
Sandecja Nowy Sącz players
Górnik Łęczna players
OKS Stomil Olsztyn players
Korona Kielce players
Ekstraklasa players
I liga players
II liga players
Latvian Higher League players
Polish expatriate footballers
Expatriate footballers in Latvia